Rush Lake is a natural lake in South Dakota, in the United States.

Rush Lake received its name from the rush which occurs at the lake.

See also
List of lakes in South Dakota

References

Lakes of South Dakota
Lakes of Day County, South Dakota